Lord Brown or Lord Browne may refer to:

Wilfred Brown, Baron Brown (1908–1985), author
George Brown, Baron George-Brown (1914–1985), British Labour politician
Nick Browne-Wilkinson, Baron Browne-Wilkinson (born 1930)
Simon Brown, Baron Brown of Eaton-under-Heywood (born 1937), British lawyer and former Justice of the Supreme Court
Wallace Browne, Baron Browne of Belmont (born 1947), Northern Irish politician
John Browne, Baron Browne of Madingley (born 1948), British businessman
Des Browne, Baron Browne of Ladyton (born 1952), British Labour Party politician
Mark Malloch Brown, Baron Malloch-Brown, UK government minister